Ben Dylan Aaronovitch (born 22 February 1964) is an English author and screenwriter. He is the author of the Rivers of London series of novels. He also wrote two Doctor Who serials in the late 1980s and spin-off novels from Doctor Who and Blake's 7.

Biography

Family
Born in Camden, Aaronovitch is the son of the economist Sam Aaronovitch who was a senior member of the Communist Party of Great Britain, and the younger brother of actor Owen Aaronovitch and journalist David Aaronovitch. He attended Holloway School.

Aaronovitch lives in Wimbledon.

Doctor Who and television work
Aaronovitch wrote two Doctor Who serials, Remembrance of the Daleks (1988) and Battlefield (1989), for BBC television, and also the novelization of the former.

He wrote one episode for Casualty (1990) and was then a regular writer on the science fiction series Jupiter Moon.

He subsequently wrote or co-wrote three Doctor Who spin-off novels in the Virgin Publishing New Adventures range; he created the character Kadiatu Lethbridge-Stewart who became a semi-regular in the New Adventures. He has also written a novel and several short stories published by Big Finish Productions featuring the character of Bernice Summerfield, who was originally developed in the New Adventures. He also co-wrote a Doctor Who audio drama for Big Finish, and has written a number of Blake's 7 spin-off audio dramas.

Proposed serials of “Doctor Who” 
Knight Fall

In May 1987, Aaronovitch submitted “Knight Fall” to the Doctor Who production office for Season 25. The story concerned privatization. Script editor Andrew Cartmel liked the story ideas, but felt that the script was inappropriate for the series and had too many supporting characters. 

Transit

After failing to feature Aaronovitch's “Knight Fall” storyline to production, Aaronovitch submitted a story in June 1987, entitled Transit. The story would see the Doctor and Ace in the future, land in a metro station, and discover transportation portals that could lead any body throughout the Solar System, but one of the portals leads a gate way to hell. Even though it is unexplainable to how Aaronovitch's scripts of “Transit” never came to fruition, he would adapt the story as a book for Virgin New Adventures series in December 1992.

Bad Destination

During Summer of 1988, Aaronovitch submitted a three-part adventure story for Doctor Who’s 27th Season (which never came to fruition), and was called ”Bad Destination”. The story would feature The Doctor seeing Ace as a captain of a hospital spaceship which is being under attack by the Metatraxi. The story, however, was abandoned when, in September 1989, the BBC cancelled Doctor Who after its 26 Season, due to declining audiences. In July 2011, Big Finish Productions released the story as Earth Aid, by Aaronovitch and Cartmel.

Television

Doctor Who
 Remembrance of the Daleks (1988)
 Battlefield (1989)

Casualty
 "Results" (1990)

Jupiter Moon
 Episode 69 (1990)
 Episode 70 (1990)
 Episode 80 (1990)
 Episode 81 (1990)
 Episode 95 (1990)
 Episode 119 (1996)
 Episode 120 (1996)
 Episode 131 (1996)
 Episode 132 (1996)
 Episode 148 (1996)

Dark Knight 
 "Stonegod" (2001)

Audio dramas

Blake's 7
 Rebel (2007)
 When Vila Met Gan (2008)
 Eye of the Machine (2008)
 Blood and Earth (2009)

Doctor Who
 Earth Aid (with Andrew Cartmel; 2011)

Novels

Doctor Who

Novelisations
 Remembrance of the Daleks

Virgin New Adventures
 Transit
 The Also People
 So Vile a Sin (with Kate Orman)

Rivers of London 

 Rivers of London (published as Midnight Riot in the US) (2011) 
 Moon Over Soho (2011) 
 Whispers Under Ground (2012) 
 Broken Homes (2013) 
 Foxglove Summer (2014) 
 The Hanging Tree (3 November 2016) 
 The Furthest Station (28 September 2017) —novella, set between Foxglove Summer and The Hanging Tree
 Lies Sleeping (6 November 2018) 
 The October Man (novella) (31 May 2019) – novella, set after Lies Sleeping in Germany, with Tobias Winter as the main character
 False Value (20 February 2020)  (Hardback);  (Export Trade Paperback);  (eBook)
What Abigail Did That Summer (18 March 2021) – novella  (Hardback);  (eBook)
 Amongst our Weapons (7 April 2022)  (Hardback)
 Winter's Gifts (novella) (coming on 8 June 2023) (Hardback / eBook / AudioBook)

Others
 Genius Loci

Comics

Rivers of London – Body Work 
Body Work #1 – 16 July 2015
Body Work #2 – 19 August 2015
Body Work #3 – 16 September 2015
Body Work #4 – 21 October 2015
Body Work #5 – 20 November 2015
Body Work (collection/graphic novel) – 29 March 2016

Rivers of London – Night Witch 
Night Witch #1 – 16 March 2016
Night Witch #2 – 13 April 2016
Night Witch #3 – 18 May 2016
Night Witch (collection/graphic novel) – 1 November 2016

Rivers of London – Black Mould 
Black Mould #1 – 12 October 2016
Black Mould #2 – 16 November 2016
Black Mould #3 – 21 December 2016
Black Mould #4 – 1 February 2017
Black Mould #5 – 8 March 2017
Black Mould (collection/graphic novel) – 25 July 2017

Rivers of London – Detective Stories 
Detective Stories #1 – 7 June 2017
Detective Stories #2 – 12 July 2017
Detective Stories #3 – 9 August 2017
Detective Stories #4 – 13 September 2017
Detective Stories (collection/graphic novel) – 29 December 2017

Rivers of London – Cry Fox 
Cry Fox #1 - 8 Nov 2017
Cry Fox #2 - 13 Dec 2017
Cry Fox #3 - 17 Jan 2018
Cry Fox #4 - 25 Apr 2018
Cry Fox (collection/graphic novel) – 26 June 2018

Rivers of London – Water Weed
Water Weed #1 - 20 Jun 2018
Water Weed #2 - 18 Jul 2018
Water Weed #3 - 15 Aug 2018
Water Weed #4 - 19 Sep 2018
Water Weed (collection/graphic novel) – 30 November 2018

Rivers of London – Action at a Distance
Action at a Distance #1 - 17 Oct 2018
Action at a Distance #2 - 21 Nov 2018
Action at a Distance #3 - 19 Dec 2018
Action at a Distance #4 - 20 Jan 2019
Action at a Distance (collection/graphic novel) – 1 November 2019

Rivers of London – The Fey & The Furious
The Fey & The Furious #1 - 6 Nov 2019
The Fey & The Furious #2 - 11 Dec 2019
The Fey & The Furious #3 - 8 Jan 2020
The Fey & The Furious #4 - 5 Feb 2020
The Fey & The Furious (collection/graphic novel) – 1 November 2020

Rivers of London – Monday, Monday
Monday, Monday #1 - 7 Jul 2021
Monday, Monday #2 - 18 Aug 2021
Monday, Monday #3 - 1 Sep 2021
Monday, Monday #4 - 6 Oct 2021
Monday, Monday (collection/graphic novel) – 5 January 2021

Short stories 
Gone Fishing in Short Trips: Time Signature
Walking Backwards for Christmas in Something Changed
The Evacuation of Bernice Summerfield Considered as a Short Film by Terry Gilliam in Missing Adventures

Rivers of London series 
The short stories below are published in 'Tales from the Folly: A Rivers of London Short Story Collection'.
The Home Crowd Advantage in the 'London Edition' of Rivers of London and on Aaronovitch's blog
The Domestic in the special Waterstones edition of Whispers Under Ground
The Cockpit in the special Waterstones edition of Broken Homes
The Loneliness of the Long Distance Granny in the special Waterstones edition of Foxglove Summer
A Rare Book of Cunning Device in a special Audible-only edition read by Kobna Holdbrook-Smith
King of the Rats in the special Waterstones edition of The Hanging Tree
Favourite Uncle in the special Waterstones edition of Lies Sleeping
A Dedicated Follower of Fashion
Vanessa Sommer's Other Christmas List
Three Rivers, Two Husbands and a Baby
Three short pieces, labelled "Moments", published on Aaronovitch's website
Moment One: London September 1966
Moment Two: Reynolds-Florence, Az. 2014
Moment Three: Tobias Winter -Meckenheim 2012

References

External links 

 
 Aaronovitch's blog
 

1964 births
Living people
English fantasy writers
English male novelists
English male screenwriters
English people of Irish descent
English people of Jewish descent
English science fiction writers
English television writers
People educated at Holloway School
Writers of Doctor Who novels
British male television writers